Raná is name of several locations in the Czech Republic:

 Raná (Chrudim District), a village in Pardubice Region
 Raná (Louny District), a village in Ústí nad Labem Region

See also
 Rané, a village in Liberec Region (Česká Lípa District)